{{Album ratings
| rev1 = Allmusic
| rev1Score =  
| rev2 = Billboard
| rev2Score =  positive<ref name="Billboard">{{cite magazine|title=Billboards Top Album Picks |date=1979-06-02|magazine=Billboard| page=70}}</ref>}}Reddy is the eleventh studio album release by Australian-American pop singer Helen Reddy. Between 1971 and 1978, Reddy had ten studio albums released by Capitol Records, the label also having issued her Greatest Hits album and a concert album: Live in London, the latter issued in December 1978 - which same month Reddy filed suit claiming Capitol Records had shortchanged her $1,793,000, the suit being an apparent bid to win release from the label. However Reddy, issued in June 1979, would be released by Capitol Records, Reddy's tenure with the label extending to include her twelfth studio album: Take What You Find, issued in 1980.Reddy was noted by Billboard magazine for what set it apart from its predecessors: "It's the three disco tracks on the first side of this album that will probably draw the most attention, but more interesting from the point of view of Reddy's artistic growth are covers of soul ballads by Gamble & Huff ('Sing My Heart Out') and Eugene Record ('Trying to Get to You') and rock material by the likes of The Doobie Brothers ('Minute by Minute')." That same review from the issue dated June 2 of that year also mentioned the exposure she received from The Helen Reddy Special, which had just aired on ABC on May 22, but, as with her previous two releases, Reddy did not reach Billboards Top LP's & Tapes chart. It was also her last album to chart in Canada's RPM magazine when it peaked at number 97 there in August of that year.



Singles
May 1979 saw the release of the track "Make Love to Me" as both a twelve-inch single featuring the entire seven-minute album cut and as a 3:48 7" single edit: the former was lauded in Billboard's "Disco Mix" column: "Reddy belts out this song with the right combination of orchestration and arrangements that have no need for a break as the tune never lets down in energy level through its 7:02-minute length." The 7" single debuted on the Hot 100 in the May 19 issue of Billboard to rise to a number 60 peak during a ten week tenure: debuting on Billboard's Adult Contemporary chart dated June 9, "Make Love to Me" would there spend five weeks reaching number 41 showings. "Make Love toe Me" also provided Reddy with her only hit on Billboard'''s R&B with a seven week tenure from July 28, 1979 and a peak of number 59.

"Make Love to Me" also afforded Reddy her final Canadian hit parade appearance, peaking at number 57 on the RPM singles chart. In Australia the June 1979 release of the Reddy album was accompanied by the single release of the track "Minute by Minute" rather than "Make Love to Me", the original version of the latter by Scottish singer Kelly Marie being still then in the Top 40 of the national Australian hit parade after peaking at number 5 in March. However "Make Love to Me" would be issued as Reddy's second Australian single - and second Australian chart shortfall - in August 1979 (which month the Kelly Marie version ended its Australian chart tenure of 41 weeks).

In the US, "Let Me Be Your Woman" - a ballad first recorded by Linda Clifford - would be the second single from Reddy and would reach number 43 Adult Contemporary during a five-week run from November 10, 1979, becoming a Hot 100 shortfall.

Reception
Both Allmusic and Billboard suggested that this should have been Reddy's comeback album, the latter noting that her "album sales have tapered off in the past few years, but this LP proves that she is staying on top of trends rather than being content to stay in a cozy but confining MOR rut." And Allmusic's Charles Donovan writes retrospectively: "Her Top Ten days were over, but on the strength of this set, they shouldn't have been." Other critics were less enthused: Peter Reilly of Stereo Review dismissed Reddy as "a disco album that goes like clockwork - and is about as interesting. [Reddy's] sound and performances are Precise, Rigid and, above all, Accurate..'Make Love to Me' ([a potentially] engaging empty headed piece of fluff) is about as feverish and abandoned as John Travolta's agent closing a deal. 'Let Me Be Your Woman' has the properly improperly lustiness of disco passion in its lyrics, but Reddy's performance [implies the] unspoken condition: only if your finish your oatmeal first. The album is engineered so that her adenoinal, girdled voice always rises above it all. Would that the listener could do the same." Christine Hogan of the Sydney Morning Herald similarly branded Reddy "a vocal technician [who] presents material in much the same fashion and with about as much feeling as a computer. [While] she sings well [on 'Reddy] particularly on songs such as..'Minute by Minute' but on 'Make Love to Me' and 'Perfect Love Affair' a hard edge creeps into her voice. She might do better controlling herself a little less".

Track listing

Side 1
 "Trying to Get to You" (Eugene Record) – 3:36
 Danny Seraphine – drums
 Teddy Randazzo – keyboards 
 Jai Winding – keyboards 
 Ira Newborn – guitar 
 Bill Neale – guitar
 Thom Rotella – guitar
 Chuck Rainey – bass guitar
 Ernie Watts – sax solo
 "Perfect Love Affair" (Pat Upton) – 3:34
 James Gadson – drums
 Teddy Randazzo – keyboards 
 Pete Robinson – keyboards 
 Paul Jackson Jr. – guitar 
 Robert Bowles – guitar
 Eddie Watkins, Jr. – bass guitar
 Ernie Watts – sax solo
 "The Magic Is Still There" (Garry Paige, Mark Punch) – 2:58
 Ed Greene – drums
 Teddy Randazzo – keyboards 
 Jai Winding – keyboards 
 Robert White – guitar 
 Bill Neale – guitar
 Scott Edwards – bass guitar
 "Make Love to Me" (Michael Tinsley, Steven Voice, Peter Yellowstone) – 7:00
 James Gadson – drums
 Teddy Randazzo – keyboards 
 Pete Robinson – keyboards 
 Paul Jackson Jr. – guitar 
 Robert Bowles – guitar
 Thom Rotella – guitar
 Eddie Watkins, Jr. – bass guitar
Side 2
 "Minute by Minute" (Lester Abrams, Michael McDonald) – 3:50
 Danny Seraphine – drums
 Teddy Randazzo – keyboards 
 Jai Winding – keyboards 
 Ira Newborn – guitar 
 Bill Neale – guitar
 Chuck Rainey – bass guitar
 "Let Me Be Your Woman" (Ed Fournier) – 3:00
 Ed Greene – drums
 Bill Cuomo – keyboards 
 Thom Rotella – guitar
 Eddie Watkins, Jr. – bass guitar
 "You're So Good" (Fred Freeman, Harry Nehls) – 2:59
 James Gadson – drums
 Teddy Randazzo – keyboards 
 Paul Jackson Jr. – guitar 
 Robert Bowles – guitar
 Eddie Watkins, Jr. – bass guitar
 Tower of Power horn section – horns 
 Lenny Pickett – sax solo
 "Words Are Not Enough" (Garry Paige, Mark Punch) – 3:07
 Ed Greene – drums
 Chet McCracken – drums
 Robert Lamm – keyboards 
 Teddy Randazzo – keyboards 
 Robert White – guitar 
 Bill Neale – guitar
 Thom Rotella – guitar
 Chuck Rainey – bass guitar
 Leon Gaer – bass guitar
 James Pankow – horns 
 Lee Loughnane – horns 
 Ernie Watts – horns 
 "Sing My Heart Out" (Kenny Gamble, Leon Huff) – 3:48
 Danny Seraphine – drums
 Jai Winding – keyboards 
 Ira Newborn – guitar 
 Bill Neale – guitar
 Chuck Rainey – bass guitar

 Rarities from the Capitol Vaults tracks

In 2009 EMI Music Special Markets released Rarities from the Capitol Vaults, a 12-track CD of mostly what were previously unreleased Reddy recordings. One of the songs included was taken from the recording sessions for Reddy'':
"Exhaustion" (Robin Sinclair) – 2:28

Charts

Personnel

Helen Reddy – vocals
Frank Day – producer; basic track arranger ("Let Me Be Your Woman", "You're So Good")
Bruce Sperling – associate producer
McKinley Jackson – arranger
John Florez – basic track producer ("Let Me Be Your Woman", "You're So Good")
D'Arneill Pershing – basic track arranger ("Let Me Be Your Woman", "You're So Good")
James Pankow – horn arranger ("Words Are Not Enough")
Greg Adams – horn arranger ("You're So Good")
Buddy Brundo – recording and mixing engineer
Cris Gordon – assistant engineer
Phil Moores – assistant engineer
recording and mixing at Conway Recording Studios, Hollywood, CA
Ken Perry – mastering
mastered at Capitol Studios, Hollywood, CA
Jeff Wald – management
Claude Mougin – photography
Roy Kohara – art direction 
Ben Barrett – contractor
Robert Lamm – background vocals
Jon English – background vocals
Dan Hamilton – background vocals
Brenda Jones – background vocals
Shirley Jones – background vocals
Valorie Jones – background vocals
The Sweet Inspirations – background vocals

Lee Loughnane – trumpet
Steve Kupka – trumpet; trombone
Greg Adams – trumpet
Ricky Baptist – trumpet
Steve Madio – trumpet
Oscar Brashear – trumpet 
Jerry Hey – trumpet
Gary Grant – trumpet
Alan Kaplan – trumpet
James Pankow – trombone
Charles Loper – trombone
Jack Redmond – trombone
Lew McCreary – trombone
Emilio Castillo – saxophone
Lenny Pickett – saxophone
Mic Gillette – saxophone
Bill Green – saxophone
Terry Harrington – saxophone
Ernie Watts – saxophone
Harry Bluestone – string concertmaster
Laudir de Oliveira – percussion

Notes

References

 

1979 albums
Capitol Records albums
Helen Reddy albums